Phraotes was an Indo-Parthian king of Taxila, in northern Ancient India, met by the Greek philosopher Apollonius of Tyana around 46 CE according to the Life of Apollonius Tyana written by Philostratus.

Apollonius reported constructions of the Greek type in Taxila, 

probably referring to Sirkap, and explains that Phraotes speaks Greek fluently, a language he had been educated in while in exile to the east, beyond the river Hyphasis:

"Tell me, O King, how you acquired such a command of the Greek tongue, and whence you derived all your philosophical attainments in this place?" 
[...]-"My father, after a Greek education, brought me to the sages at an age somewhat too early perhaps, for I was only twelve at the time, but they brought me up like their own son; for any that they admit knowing the Greek tongue they are especially fond of, because they consider that in virtue of the similarity of his disposition he already belongs to themselves."

Coins of a king "Prahat" or "Prahara", thought to be Phraotes, have been found in the area of Taxila, and it has been suggested that he might be identical with the Indo-Parthian king Gondophares. This is however unlikely, as this king was probably much earlier, but he could have been one of the later Indo-Parthian kings who were also named Gondophares.

Notes

Indo-Parthian Kingdom
1st-century Iranian people
Zoroastrian rulers